Blackerby is both a surname and a given name. Notable people with the name include:

George Blackerby (1903–1987), American baseball player
Blackerby Fairfax (fl. 1728), English physician